Chen Mo and Meiting is a 2002 Chinese romantic drama film written and directed by Liu Hao. It was Liu's directorial debut and stars Du Huanan and Wang Lingbo as the titular Chen Mo and Meiting.

The film was produced independently of the Chinese bureaucracy, primarily from funds solicited by Liu Hao himself, as well as some foreign investment from the Germany-based Zero Film.

Chen Mo and Meiting tells the story of a flower vendor and a massage parlor girl, the children of persecuted intellectuals during the Cultural Revolution, as they enter into a shy and tentative romance.

Production 
After writing the screenplay for Chen Mo and Meiting, Liu set out to find the money to finance his project. Eventually Liu was forced to search for benefactors from the phone book, eventually raising ¥140,000 from a friend in Shanghai.

Given the small budget, the film production was limited with Liu and the crew living in a small basement to save on housing costs. Post-production was funded primarily from Liu and his producers selling calendars on the street, eventually paying off debts over the course of two years.

Though filmed in 16 mm, the film was blown up to 35 mm during post-production.

Release 
Chen Mo and Meiting was screened as part of the 2002 Berlin International Film Festival's international Forum program. The film managed to win two awards at the competition: a NETPAC Prize and a Special Mention in the Premiere First Movie award.

The film was also screened at the 2002 Karlovy Vary International Film Festival as part of its "Another View" program for more experimental works.

As an independent and foreign-financed film, however, Chen Mo and Meiting was not given official approval and as a result was not released in China.

References

External links 
 
 Chen Mo and Meiting at Cinemasie

2000s Mandarin-language films
2002 films
Chinese drama films
2002 romantic drama films
Films set in Beijing
2002 directorial debut films
2000s Chinese films